Mommie Dearest is a 1981 American biographical psychological drama film directed by Frank Perry. The film depicts Christina Crawford's adoptive mother, actress Joan Crawford, as an abusive, controlling and manipulative mother.

Starring Faye Dunaway, Mara Hobel, and Diana Scarwid, the film was adapted for the screen by Robert Getchell, Tracy Hotchner, Frank Perry, and Frank Yablans from Christina's 1978 autobiography of the same name. The executive producers were Christina's husband, David Koontz, and Terry O'Neill, Dunaway's then-boyfriend and soon-to-be husband. The film was distributed by Paramount Pictures, the only one of the Big Eight film studios for which Crawford had never appeared in a feature film.

The film was a box office disappointment, grossing just over $19 million in North America from a $10 million budget. Despite receiving mostly negative reviews from critics, the film's perceived bizarre script and highly charged acting, particularly Dunaway's, have brought a cult following to the film as an "unintentional comedy". It is often considered to be one of the worst films ever made. It was nominated for nine Razzies at the 2nd Golden Raspberry Awards, and won five, including Worst Picture.

Plot
Joan Crawford is a driven actress and compulsively clean housekeeper who tries to control the lives of those around her as tightly as she controls herself. To prepare for work at MGM Studios, she rises at 4:00a.m., scrubbing her face and arms with soap and boiling water before plunging her face into a bowl of witch hazel and ice to close the pores. Helga, a new maid, thinks Joan's living room is spotless, but Joan finds a detail she overlooked and loses her temper.

Joan is in a relationship with Hollywood lawyer Gregg Savitt, but her career is on a downswing. Despite wanting a baby, she cannot get pregnant; seven pregnancies when she was married to actor Franchot Tone ended in miscarriages. When denied an application for adoption, she enlists Gregg's help to secure a baby. Joan adopts a girl, Christina, and then a boy, Christopher. Joan lavishes Christina with attention and luxury, such as an extravagant birthday party, but also enforces a code of denial and discipline. When Christina is showered with birthday gifts, Joan allows her to choose just one to keep and donates the rest to charity.

When Christina rebels against her mother, confrontations ensue. Joan beats Christina in a swimming pool race and laughs at her; when Christina reacts angrily, Joan becomes enraged and locks the child in the pool house. Later, when Joan discovers Christina wearing her makeup and imitating her, she takes offense and cuts off chunks of Christina's hair to punish her.

Joan resents Gregg's allegiance to studio boss Louis B. Mayer. Arguing with Gregg, she downs glasses of vodka and throws a drink in his face. When Gregg breaks up with her, she cuts him out of photos. When Mayer forces Joan to leave MGM after theater owners brand her "box-office poison", she hacks down her prized rose garden with a pair of gardening shears and an ax.

Joan finds Christina's expensive dresses hanging from wire hangers, which she despises and prohibits. Enraged, Joan yanks dresses from Christina's closet, throwing them all over her room, and beats Christina with the metal hanger as she squeals. Declaring that the sparkling clean bathroom floor is dirty, Joan throws cleaning powder all over it before striking Christina across the back with the can and wailing for someone to clean it.

Joan sends Christina to Chadwick School. Years later, when a teenage Christina is caught kissing a boy, Joan brings her home. Barbara Bennett, a reporter from Redbook, is there, writing a puff piece on Joan's home life. After Joan lies about Christina, saying she got expelled, Christina confronts her in front of the reporter. Joan slaps Christina twice in the face and Christina forces Joan to admit that she was adopted for publicity. The confrontation ends with Joan tackling Christina to the floor and strangling her. Christina thrashes around helplessly until Joan's live-in assistant and the reporter pull her away.

Joan sends Christina to Flintridge Sacred Heart Academy, where she is allowed no contact with the outside world. Joan marries Alfred Steele, CEO of Pepsi Cola, moves to New York City, and pressures him to go into debt to fund their lavish lifestyle. After his death, the Pepsi board of directors tries to force her to resign, but Joan threatens to publicly badmouth the product if they do not let her retain her position.

After graduating from Flintridge, Christina rents an apartment in Manhattan, and is acting in a soap opera. When Christina is hospitalized for an ovarian tumor, she is temporarily replaced on the show by her visibly drunk mother. Joan dies of cancer in 1977, and Christina and Christopher learn she has disinherited them both. Christopher says their mother has the last word, as usual; Christina says, "Does she?".

Cast

Production

According to Dunaway, producer Frank Yablans promised her in the casting process that he wished to portray Joan Crawford in a more moderate way than she was portrayed in Christina Crawford's book. In securing the rights to the book, Christina's husband David Koontz was given an executive producer credit, though he had no experience producing films. Dunaway likewise demanded that her own husband,  photographer Terry O'Neill, be given a producer credit so  he could advocate for her on set. According to Yablans, the two husbands jostled over Dunaway's portrayal of Crawford: "I had two husbands to deal with, David driving me crazy that Faye was trying to sanitize Joan, and Terry worried we were pushing Faye too far and creating a monster."

In 2015, actress Rutanya Alda (Carol Ann) published a behind-the-scenes memoir, detailing the making of the film, The Mommie Dearest Diary: Carol Ann Tells All. In it, she describes the difficulty of working with Dunaway, whose method approach to playing Joan seemed to absorb her and make her difficult to the cast and crew. In an interview with the Bay Area Reporter, Alda stated, "People despised Faye...because she was rude to people. Everyone was on pins and needles when she worked, and relaxed when she didn't." Alda described the process of acting opposite Dunaway very unfavorably by claiming that she manipulated the director to deprive the other actors of screen time and required the members of the cast to turn their backs when not in the shot so she would have no audience. She also claimed that Dunaway was "out of control" while filming the scene where Joan attacks Christina (Diana Scarwid) in front of a reporter (Jocelyn Brando) and Carol Ann has to pull her off. Alda was hit hard in the chest and knocked over several times, while Brando, who was scripted to help Alda pull Dunaway off of Scarwid, refused to get near her for fear of being injured.

Release
Roughly a month into release, Paramount realized the film was getting a reputation at the box office as an unintentional comedy and changed its advertising to reflect its new camp status, proclaiming, "Meet the biggest MOTHER of them all!"

Paramount Pictures released the film on Blu-ray from a newly restored 4K film transfer for its 40th anniversary on June 1, 2021.

Contemporary criticism
Roger Ebert opened his one-star review with, "I can't imagine who would want to subject themselves to this movie," calling it "unremittingly depressing, not to any purpose of drama or entertainment, but just to depress. It left me feeling creepy."

About Dunaway's performance, Variety said, "Dunaway does not chew scenery. Dunaway starts neatly at each corner of the set in every scene and swallows it whole, costars and all."

Vincent Canby of The New York Times called it "an extremely strange movie" yet "a peculiarly engaging film, one that can go from the ridiculous to the sublime and back again within a single scene, sometimes within a single speech."

Gene Siskel of the Chicago Tribune gave the film two and a half stars out of four and wrote, "'Mommie Dearest' isn't a bad film, it's more of an incomplete story," because the script "doesn't care enough to attempt a thoughtful answer to the most obvious question of all—why? Why did Joan Crawford punish her adopted daughter with beatings and isolation? Why did Joan Crawford force her adopted son to wear, in effect, a harness to strap him in bed? I don't think you can show such extraordinary behavior in a film about a famous person and not offer some answers. It's simply not responsible filmmaking, both intellectually and dramatically."

Kevin Thomas of the Los Angeles Times wrote that Faye Dunaway "is a terrific Joan Crawford," but the film "plays like a limp parody of a bad Crawford movie. When Dunaway's Crawford, who's a seething volcano of emotions, finally erupts, the effect is laughable, rather than terrifying or pathetic, so pallid is the picture. 'Mommie Dearest' is at best campy, and at worst, merely plodding."

Pauline Kael declared that Faye Dunaway gave "a startling, ferocious performance," adding, "Dunaway brings off these camp horror scenes—howling 'No wire hangers!' and weeping while inflecting 'Tina, bring me the axe' with the beyond-the-crypt chest tones of a basso profundo—but she also invests the part with so much power and suffering that these scenes transcend camp."

Gary Arnold of The Washington Post wrote, "one doesn't envy screen writers obliged to hack a playable, coherent continuity out of the complicated chronology and simple-minded psychoanalysis that clogs the book. It's a booby-trapped source, and there are intermittent signs of both skill and wariness in the filmmakers ... But once the ugly stuff begins, all that methodical preparation and desire to be fair becomes meaningless. The movie is committed to a prolonged, exhibitionistic wallow and can't escape the trashy consequences."

Awards and honors

Retrospective criticism
Among retrospective reviews, Slant Magazine awarded the film four stars in the May 31, 2006 edition.  Also, Dennis Price wrote, "Faye Dunaway portrays Joan Crawford in a likeness so chilling it's almost unnatural" in his assessment of the film for DVD Review. On Rotten Tomatoes, the film holds an approval rating of 47% based on 47 reviews, with an average rating of 5.5/10. The website's critics consensus states: "Mommie Dearest certainly doesn't lack for conviction, and neither does Faye Dunaway's legendary performance as a wire-wielding monster; unfortunately, the movie is too campy and undisciplined to transcend guilty pleasure." On Metacritic, the film has a weighted average score of 55 out of 100, based on 13 critics, indicating "mixed or average reviews".

Home media
Mommie Dearest was released by Paramount Home Video on VHS in the 1990s. In 2006, a "Hollywood Royalty" bilingual Special Collector's Edition was released on DVD through Warner Home Video. Subsequent Blu-ray releases of the film have existed since 2017, facilitated through Paramount Pictures, while Amazon Prime and Paramount Plus both control the film's streaming format.

Legacy
Christina Crawford, the writer of the memoir on which the film is based, had no involvement with the making of the film, and denounced the film as "grotesque" and a work of fiction, specifically stating that Joan never chopped down a tree with an ax, or beat her with a wire hanger as depicted in the film.

For decades, Dunaway was famously reluctant to discuss Mommie Dearest in interviews. In her 1997 autobiography, she only briefly mentions the film by stating that she wished that director Perry had had enough experience to see when actors needed to rein in their performances. In 2016, Dunaway expressed regret over taking the part and blamed it for causing a decline in her Hollywood career. She also claimed that the performance took a heavy emotional toll on her stating: "At night, I would go home to the house we had rented in Beverly Hills, and felt Crawford in the room with me, this tragic, haunted soul just hanging around...It was as if she couldn't rest."

The film is recognized by the American Film Institute in these lists:
 2003: AFI's 100 Years...100 Heroes & Villains:
 Joan Crawford – #41 Villain
 2005: AFI's 100 Years...100 Movie Quotes:
 Joan Crawford: "No wire hangers, ever!" – #72

See also
 List of films considered the worst
 Psycho-biddy

References

External links

 
 
 
 

 

1981 films
1981 comedy-drama films
1980s biographical drama films
1980s English-language films
American biographical drama films
Biographical films about actors
Cultural depictions of actors
Cultural depictions of American women
Films about child abuse
Films about domestic violence
Films about dysfunctional families
Films based on biographies
Films directed by Frank Perry
Films scored by Henry Mancini
Films set in Los Angeles
Films set in California
Films set in New York City
Films shot in Los Angeles
Films shot in California
Films set in the 1930s
Films set in the 1940s
Films set in the 1950s
Films set in the 1960s
Films set in the 1970s
Joan Crawford
Films about mother–daughter relationships
Paramount Pictures films
Golden Raspberry Award winning films
1980s American films
Films with screenplays by Robert Getchell
Films with screenplays by Frank Yablans